William Lonsdale (2 or 21 October 1799 – 28 March 1864) supervised the founding of the official settlement at Port Phillip (later named Melbourne) from 1836 and went on to serve under the Superintendent La Trobe from 1839 to 1854.

Early life
Lonsdale was born in Den Helder, Batavian Republic, during Britain's failed campaign to restore the deposed Prince William of Orange. His father, Lieutenant James Lonsdale, had been accompanied by his wife Jane (née Faunce). William at age 20 joined his father's old regiment, the King's Own (4th) Regiment of the Foot, as an ensign on 8 July 1819.  He was soon joined by his younger brother, . William and  served with their Regiment in the West Indies and on 4 March 1824 William was promoted Lieutenant and appointed Adjutant.  He returned to England and was posted to Portugal.  By 1830 he was back in England and by 20 March 1831 his Regiment was posted to the Colony of New South Wales to relieve the 39th Regiment.  He was to become a colonial administrator as well as his profession as a soldier.

Colonial Australia
Lonsdale arrived in Sydney on 14 December 1831 with a detachment of troops guarding convicts on the Bussorah Merchant. During the next five years he served in the colony of New South Wales, his brother  serving in Van Diemen's Land before joining him in New South Wales in 1833. Whilst stationed at Port Macquarie, William was able to purchase his commission as a captain, and married Martha néeSmythe on 4 April 1835.  He returned to Sydney Town and on 2 January 1836 was gazetted as a Magistrate of the Territory and also as Assistant Police Magistrate.  William and Martha's first child, Alice Mary, was born at Parramatta on 20 February 1836.

The increasing problem of illegal settlements at the remote location of Port Phillip on the south coast of New South Wales was resolved by Governor Sir Richard Bourke when, having reported the matter to London, he received Imperial authority to establish a settlement.  He immediately appointed Captain William Lonsdale as Chief Agent of Government, Police Magistrate and Commandant for the Port Phillip region.  Lonsdale's Chief Agent duties were authorised in written instructions from Governor Sir Richard Bourke:   This effectively gave William Lonsdale authority that made him an unofficial "Superintendent".  Colonial secretary Alexander McLeay followed this instruction with a written appointment for Lonsdale stating that the Governor had placed his   His instructions also contained specific reference to the Aboriginal natives in which he was to   There was added comment that "if they became violent they were to be restrained  by the gentlest means, but they (the natives) must try to understand that white or black, all came under the Laws of England."

He also had instructions from the Governor to submit direct to the Governor "Confidential Reports" on the developments at Port Phillip. It appears that the Governor was engaged in a power struggle with Sydney's Colonial bureaucracy, labelled the "Exclusives", his Colonial Secretary McLeay being a member of that group. This "Confidential Report" appeared necessary to ensure no one of significance gained too much prior advantage in any land development at this Port Phillip outpost. It also indicated that Captain William Lonsdale was held in high esteem by Governor Sir Richard Bourke who had personally chosen him to manage this Port Phillip settlement foundation.

Lonsdale's salary was 300 pounds Sterling, 50 pounds being deducted whilst he drew half pay from his Regiment as Commandant of a Company of the King's Own 4th at Port Phillip. He received a 100-pound outfitting allowance for this new appointment. It was important that a warship of the Imperial Navy be present to reinforce the Governor's power, now delegated to Lonsdale as General Agent of Government. Lonsdale had to establish a new remote settlement that was only accessible by sea, as no overland route existed from Sydney to Port Phillip, as southern New South Wales was a vast forest with large rivers, yet to be explored.

Only twenty-one days had elapsed from the time Governor Bourke received Imperial authority to establish the settlement to the time Lonsdale sailed in HMS Rattlesnake for Port Phillip.  This speed reflected Bourke's concerns about the 200 illegal settlers at Port Phillip, who were claiming land and negotiating with the aboriginal natives for other areas.  He needed to act quickly, and to the overall credit of the Sydney public service, they arranged it all in three weeks, but then the Governor was determined to make it happen.

Lonsdale finally arrived at Port Phillip with his wife Martha, daughter Alice and his one assigned servant, on board HMS Rattlesnake, commanded by  Hobson (later Governor of New Zealand).

They first anchored at the south end of the bay on 27 September 1836, where Hobson despatched a cutter for survey work, and by 29th had proceeded north and anchored off Point Gellibrand, Hobsons Bay, near the mouth of the Yarra River.  The survey cutter would join them later.

Captain William Lonsdale immediately landed unofficially, distributing the official proclamation of the establishment of the new settlement and followed this up with a second informal visit the following day.

On 1 October 1836 Captain Hobson had Lonsdale, in full King's Own uniform, formally rowed up the Yarra River by the Rattlesnake'''s crew and Marines, finally making landfall on the north bank of the river.  A rock bar existed across the river at this point, the river pouring through a fissure in the rock.   This location is where the present historic Customs House is now located.

Here Captain William Lonsdale was met by John Batman and Dr Thompson and other assembled illegal settlers, all anxious to have their land claims and investments validated.

Captain Lonsdale remained on Board HMS Rattlesnake until the prefabricated house, sent from Sydney for the Ensign, was erected on shore. Lonsdale chose this first government building for his, and his family's use until his own prefabricated house arrived in the next few months.

Three surveyors, two customs clerks, a commissariat clerk, Ensign King, thirty privates and thirty convicts arrived during October, on board the two hired transports, Stirlingshire and Martha.

Besides Lonsdale's duties for the immediate exercise of authority of the government, and his Confidential Reports to the Governor, he was to take a census, noting land occupation and aboriginals.

When Governor Bourke visited Port Phillip in March 1837 he praised Lonsdale's ability, zeal and discretion, confirmed Lonsdale's choice of a site for the new town and named it Melbourne.  Lonsdale chose the Yarra River site for its access to abundant fresh water, which the Williamstown site lacked.   The foundations of the new settlement having been laid Lonsdale conscientiously followed instructions, referring all decisions he made to his superiors in Sydney.   Lonsdale supervised the first land sale in June 1837. and as there were no Banks in the Port Phillip settlement of Melbourne, he personally used his own funds in a Sydney bank to pay the government what was due to them.  In this way he allowed purchasers to retain cash in the settlement which would have been otherwise left without any 'money in hand' needed for their further development of the settlement.  Lonsdale, if it was within his power was there to make it happen, and at the same time uphold the law.

During the next two years of his administration, friction developed between Lonsdale and the government surveyors, Robert Hoddle and Robert Russell, and local entrepreneurs who resented his General Agent of Government powers, but they had to follow the Governor's orders, Lonsdale was adamant. He was highly respected.

Charles Joseph La Trobe arrived in Melbourne in October 1839 as Port Phillip's first Superindendant and he relieved Captain William Lonsdale of his General Agent of Government duties.  The people of Melbourne marked the occasion by giving William Lonsdale an Address and financial gifts, from the settlers, including the new Superintendent.   They presented him with 325 pounds for an inscribed silver service.  Lonsdale continued to act as Police Magistrate until appointed as Sub-Treasurer of the district on a salary of 400 pounds in April 1840. His relations with Latrobe and the new Governor, Sir George Gipps, were always good.  When local government was introduced to Melbourne Captain William Lonsdale was appointed the interim acting mayor until elections were held.   When La Trobe was appointed acting as Lieut-Governor of Van Dieman's Land Captain William Lonsdale was appointed Acting Superintendent during La Trobe's absence.

In 1851, after Victoria became a separate colony, Lonsdale was appointed its first colonial secretary on a salary of 900 pounds. He served in the Victorian Legislative Council from 31 October 1851 to 1853, the turbulent years of the gold rushes.

During the period 1836 to 1854 the Lonsdale family increased in number (two dying in infancy) - Liona Kingsown b:1838, Edgar b:1839, Ellen Peveril b:1842 d:1842, William b:1843, Ralph Peveril b:1847 d:1852, Ethilda Wagstaffe b:1845, Rupert Latrobe b:1849.

Lonsdale Street, Melbourne is named in his honour and his portrait is in the Mitchell Library, Sydney

Late life
Lonsdale's last public office was Colonial Treasurer on a salary of 1500 pounds from July 1853 until July 1854 when he followed LaTrobe's example and retired and returned to England. In England the Lonsdale's had two more children - Maude Smythe b:1858 and Oswald b:1860.
William died in London on 28 March 1864 and was survived by his widow, 4 sons and 4 daughters.

References

J.M Wilkins; The Life and Times of Captain William Lonsdale "Nieuwe Dieper" 1794 - 1864; 1991

Additional resources listed by the Australian Dictionary of Biography:Historical Records of Australia, Series I, vols 18, 20, 22–3, 25
H. G. Turner, A History of the Colony of Victoria, vols 1-2 (London, 1904)
R. D. Boys, First Years at Port Phillip (Melb, 1959)New South Wales Government Gazette, 1836, 1, 395, 709
E. Scott, ‘Capt Lonsdale and the Foundation of Melbourne’, Victorian Historical Magazine, 4 (1914–15)
E. Scott, ‘The Administration of Capt Lonsdale’, Victorian Historical Magazine, 6 (1917–18)The Times'' (London), 31 Mar 1864; CO 309/1

 

Settlers of Melbourne
Public servants from Melbourne
1799 births
1864 deaths
Members of the Victorian Legislative Council
People from Den Helder
Treasurers of Victoria
19th-century Australian politicians
19th-century Australian public servants